Citizens Business Bank is a specialty financial institution headquartered in Ontario, California.  It was founded as Chino Valley Bank in 1970. CVB Financial Corporation is the holding company for Citizens Business Bank. It has over $14 billion in total assets. The parent company is traded on the NASDAQ as CVBF.

In 2018, Citizens acquired Pasadena-based Community Bank, which was founded in 1945. In 1995, the company acquired Citizens Commercial Trust and Savings Bank, also of Pasadena. In 1994, the company assumed the operations of the failed  Pioneer Bank of Fullerton, California.

As of 2021, the bank had 57 physical locations following a 2019 branch consolidation.

Citizens Business Bank is the former name sponsor of the Toyota Arena in Ontario, California.

References

Banks based in California